The News Quiz is a British topical panel game broadcast on BBC Radio 4.

History
The News Quiz was first broadcast in 1977 with Barry Norman as chairman. Subsequently, it was chaired by Barry Took from 1979 to 1981, Simon Hoggart from 1981 to 1986, Barry Took again from 1986 to 1995, and then again by Simon Hoggart from 1996 until March 2006. Hoggart was replaced by Sandi Toksvig in September 2006, who in turn was replaced by Miles Jupp in September 2015 until his departure at the end of 2019. Three different hosts took the chair in 2020, Nish Kumar (series 101), Angela Barnes (series 102), and Andy Zaltzman (series 103). At the end of series 103 it was announced that Zaltzman would continue as permanent host. The series was created by John Lloyd based on an idea from Nicholas Parsons.

Originally Private Eye editor Richard Ingrams and Punch editor Alan Coren acted as team captains.

It was adapted for television in 1981 under the title Scoop, running for two series, and later inspired the television programme Have I Got News for You.

In 2012 the BBC piloted an American version hosted by Lewis Black.

On 28 June 2013, the News Quiz paid tribute to Radio 4 announcer Rory Morrison, who used to read the news cuttings on the programme.

During series 97, running from August to October 2018, Jupp was absent due to filming commitments overseas, so show regulars Simon Evans, Susan Calman, Fred MacAulay, Bridget Christie, Jo Brand and Lucy Porter took turns in the host's seat. Jupp himself chaired the first and last episodes of the series.

In May 2019 it was announced that Jupp would leave the show at the end of the 99th series at the end of the month. Series 100 had several hosts: Nish Kumar, Angela Barnes, Andy Zaltzman, Phil Wang, Kiri Pritchard-McLean, Zoe Lyons, Patrick Kielty and Andrew Maxwell. The hosts for 2020 were Nish Kumar, Angela Barnes and Andy Zaltzman. Zaltzman was named as the permanent host at the conclusion of series 103.

Transmission
The programme is usually recorded in front of an audience on Thursday evenings at the BBC Radio Theatre at Broadcasting House in central London. It is then edited and broadcast first on Friday evening at 18:30, then repeated at Saturday lunchtime. The final 28 minute show is significantly shorter than the original recording.  In 2012 the BBC began making an extended version for BBC Radio 4 Extra.

Each week, four panellists appear on the show. They are usually either comedians or journalists, and sometimes politicians. Journalists predominated in the early years. The ostensible purpose of the show is to test contestants' knowledge of the events of the previous week by asking questions which are usually oblique references to those events.  However this has given way to a general free-for-all where panellists chime in with their own humorous and satirical remarks once the question has been answered. The participants frequently wander off topic. The host ends the discussion of each question with a summary of the events it refers to, usually with a scripted comic punchline, before asking the next question. It is not uncommon for the show to get through only two rounds of the panel before the final section is reached. Before the host announces the largely symbolic scores, the panellists read out statements from newspapers and other media which they find amusing.

Personnel

Current host
In 2020, Andy Zaltzman guest hosted series 103 and at the end of the run was announced as the new permanent host.

Former hosts
 Barry Norman (1977–1979) 
 Barry Took (1979–1981 & 1986–1995)
 Simon Hoggart (1981–1985 & 1996–2006)
 Sandi Toksvig (2006–2015)
 Miles Jupp (2015–2019, series 88–99)
 Nish Kumar, Angela Barnes, Andy Zaltzman, Phil Wang, Kiri Pritchard-McLean, Zoe Lyons, Patrick Kielty and Andrew Maxwell (September – October 2019, series 100)
 Nish Kumar (2020, series 101)
 Angela Barnes (2020, series 102)

Current regular panellists
 Susan Calman
 Simon Evans
 Andy Hamilton
 Helen Lewis
 Zoe Lyons
 Fred MacAulay
 Lucy Porter
 Hugo Rifkind
 Mark Steel
 Francis Wheen
 Angela Barnes
 Andrew Maxwell

Former regular panellists

 Samira Ahmed
 Alan Coren
 Rebecca Front
 Jeremy Hardy
 Ian Hislop
 Simon Hoggart (also a former host)
 Armando Iannucci (also a former producer of the programme)
 Richard Ingrams
 Jonathan King
 Sue Perkins
 Carrie Quinlan
 Linda Smith
 Sandi Toksvig (later a host)
 Barry Took (also a former host)

BBC newsreaders
The News Quiz also features considerable comedic input from regular BBC newsreaders (or "hacks-neutral", as Alan Coren  referred to them).  The current regulars are:

 Corrie Corfield
 Caroline Nicholls
 Susan Rae
 Neil Sleat
 Kathy Clugston
 Alan Smith
 Zeb Soanes
 Diana Speed

And former regulars include:

 Chris Aldridge
 Carolyn Brown
 Harriet Cass
 Peter Donaldson
 Charlotte Green
 Rory Morrison
 Brian Perkins

Corrie Corfield appeared as a panellist once when Sandi Toksvig was unable to attend. As a current BBC newsreader she was bound by the BBC's code of practice for newsreaders, which prevented her from making any opinionated comments on-air (When asked, "What do you think of Bush, Corrie?", she responded, "He's an American.")

Peter Donaldson also appeared as a guest, in an episode broadcast in September 1999.

Producers

Gwyn Rhys Davies
Suzy Grant
Victoria Lloyd
Richard Morris
Joe Nunnery
Paul Sheehan
Lyndsay Fenner 
Sam Michell 
Sam Bryant
Ed Morrish
Katie Tyrrell
Simon Nicholls
Lucy Armitage
Jon Rolph
Aled Evans
Harry Thompson
Armando Iannucci
John Lloyd
Louise Coats

Scriptwriters
Each week, the chair's script is written by three main writers, with material contributed by one or two additional writers. Current regular writers include:

 Benjamin Partridge 
 Alice Fraser 
 Madeleine Brettingham
 Laura Major
 Mike Shephard
 Robin Morgan
 Max Davis
 Sarah Morgan
 Gabby Hutchinson Crouch
 Catherine Brinkworth
 Kat Sadler
 Simon Alcock

Former regular writers include:

 James Kettle
 Simon Littlefield
 Rhodri Crooks
 Lucy Clarke
 Gareth Gwynn
 John-Luke Roberts
 Jon Hunter
 Andy Wolton
 James Sherwood
 Stephen Carlin
 George Poles
 Paul McKenzie
 Dave Cohen
 Tom Jamieson
 Nev Fountain
 Debbie Barham
 Iain Pattinson (1990s)

Music
The opening title music is an arrangement of The Typewriter, by Leroy Anderson played by The James Shepherd Versatile Brass. For the programme the original recording (on Decca records SB 314) has been increased in speed and pitch by about 33%.

Cultural references
BBC MindGames Magazine regularly featured several BBC-linked puzzles, including The News Quiz, a series of questions about the last month's more unlikely news.  Issue 5 (November 2006) also included an interview with Sandi Toksvig.

Audiobook releases
Entire series from series 87 onwards have been released on audio CD and made available for download.  The following compilations have also been released by BBC Audio.

 Simon Hoggart's Pick of The News Quiz: Volume 1 (6 Nov 2000)
 Simon Hoggart's Pick of The News Quiz: Volume 2 (23 Sep 2002)
 The News Quiz: The First 25 Years (1 Jul 2003)
 The News Quiz: The Very Best Of 2004 (1 Nov 2004)
 The News Quiz: The Best of 2005 (18 Oct 2005)
 The News Quiz: Hold The Front Page (2 Oct 2006)
 The News Quiz: Stop Press! (1 Oct 2007)
 The News Quiz: "Read All About It!" (27 Nov 2008)
 The News Quiz: Soundbites (13 Nov 2014)
 The News Quiz: The Best Of 2015 (5 Nov 2015)
 The News Quiz: A Vintage Collection 1977–2002 (3 Aug 2017)
 The News Quiz: The Best Of 2017 (2 Nov 2017)
 The News Quiz: The Best Of 2018 (1 Nov 2018)
 The News Quiz: Classic Collection (audio download only, 15 Aug 2019)
 The News Quiz: The Best Of 2019 (7 Nov 2019)

Podcast
As of 28 September 2007, The News Quiz became downloadable as part of the "Friday Night Comedy" podcast feed for Radio 4. The podcast switches between The News Quiz and The Now Show, depending on which show is being transmitted.  During Miles Jupp's tenure, an extended version of the show entitled The News Quiz Extra featuring an additional 10–15 minutes of material was broadcast on BBC Radio 4 Extra in the week following the standard Radio 4 broadcast.  This version was also made available as a podcast.

References

External links

1977 radio programme debuts
Audio podcasts
BBC Radio 4 programmes
BBC Radio comedy programmes
British panel games
British satirical radio programmes
Comedy and humor podcasts
British radio game shows
1970s British game shows
1980s British game shows
1990s British game shows
2000s British game shows
2010s British game shows
BBC panel games
Satirical radio programmes
2007 podcast debuts